The Town of Crows Nest is located in Washington Township, Marion County, Indiana, approximately  northwest of downtown Indianapolis. The town is adjacent to the neighboring community of North Crows Nest.  It includes two streets: Sunset Lane south of Kessler Boulevard and Questover Circle.  The population was 73 at the 2010 census. It has existed as an "included town" since 1970, when it was incorporated into Indianapolis as part of Unigov.  It is part of Indianapolis, but retains a functioning town government under IC 36-3-1-11.

History
Crows Nest was founded in 1927 and supposedly was named from crows nesting nearby.

The Town of Crows Nest Historic District is a  historic district that was listed on the National Register of Historic Places in 2000.  It encompasses 29 contributing buildings, 5 contributing sites, 4 contributing structures, and 3 contributing objects in an exclusive residential enclave of Indianapolis. The district developed between about 1905 and 1950, and includes representative examples of Tudor Revival, Colonial Revival, Renaissance Revival, and Art Deco style architecture. Notable contributing resources include Vellameda (1904-1905), W. Hathaway Simmons House (1914), Walden Estate (1927), Lane's End Estate (1928), Goodman House (1927), and Eli Lilly House (1930).

Geography 
Crows Nest is located at  (39.852208, -86.172811).

Demographics

2010 census
As of the census of 2010, there were 73 people, 34 households, and 28 families living in the town. The racial makeup of the town was 97.3% White and 2.7% African American. Hispanic or Latino of any race were 1.4% of the population.

There were 34 households, of which 5.9% had children under the age of 18 living with them, 73.5% were married couples living together, 2.9% had a female householder with no husband present, 5.9% had a male householder with no wife present, and 17.6% were non-families. 14.7% of all households were made up of individuals. The average household size was 2.15 and the average family size was 2.32.

The median age in the town was 60.3 years. 4.1% of residents were under the age of 18; 6.8% were between the ages of 18 and 24; 9.6% were from 25 to 44; 53.5% were from 45 to 64; and 26% were 65 years of age or older. The gender makeup of the town was 53.4% male and 46.6% female.

2000 census
As of the census of 2000, there were 96 people, 39 households, and 31 families living in the town. The racial makeup of the town was 100.00% White.

There were 39 households, out of which 28.2% had children under the age of 18 living with them, 71.8% were married couples living together, 2.6% had a female householder with no husband present, and 20.5% were non-families. 17.9% of all households were made up of individuals, and 12.8% had someone living alone who was 65 years of age or older. The average household size was 2.46 and the average family size was 2.77.

In the town, the population was spread out, with 19.8% under the age of 18, 6.3% from 18 to 24, 11.5% from 25 to 44, 41.7% from 45 to 64, and 20.8% who were 65 years of age or older. The median age was 52 years. For every 100 females, there were 88.2 males. For every 100 females age 18 and over, there were 87.8 males.

The median income for a household in the town was $154,780, and the median income for a family was $153,320. Males had a median income of $100,000 versus $68,750 for females. The per capita income for the town was $100,565. None of the population or the families were below the poverty line.

References

External links

Towns in Marion County, Indiana
Towns in Indiana
Indianapolis metropolitan area
Historic districts on the National Register of Historic Places in Indiana
National Register of Historic Places in Indianapolis